Enoch Madison Fenton House, also known as the Edward Jackson Fenton House and The Fenton Homeplace, was a historic home located near Rushville, Buchanan County, Missouri.  It was built about 1850, and was a two-story, rectangular, Greek Revival style frame dwelling. It had a one-story addition, ell shaped addition, and sat on a limestone foundation.  Also on the property were a root cellar and board-and-batten smokehouse.  It has been demolished.

It was listed on the National Register of Historic Places in 1982.

References

Houses on the National Register of Historic Places in Missouri
Greek Revival houses in Missouri
Houses completed in 1850
Houses in Buchanan County, Missouri
National Register of Historic Places in Buchanan County, Missouri